The Blonde Saint is a 1926 American silent romantic adventure film directed by Svend Gade. It was produced by Sam E. Rork and released through First National Pictures. Lewis Stone and Doris Kenyon star and young newcomer Gilbert Roland is featured.

Plot
The plot of the film bears a striking resemblance to the plot of the Warner Brothers talkie, One Way Passage (1932). This silent appears to have been more exotic.

Cast

Production
Producer Rork's 19-year-old daughter, Ann Rork, has a major role in the film as she has in her father's later produced The Notorious Lady (1927). Lewis Stone also returned in The Notorious Lady.

This was the final film of screenwriter Marion Fairfax. She and producer Rork had formed a partnership to make films in 1925, but, following the completion The Blonde Saint and a severe illness, she left film making and then wrote only for periodicals.

Preservation
An abridged and or incomplete version of survives in the British Film Institute National Film and Television Archive, London.

References

External links

1926 films
American silent feature films
Films based on American novels
First National Pictures films
1926 romantic drama films
American romantic drama films
American black-and-white films
Films directed by Svend Gade
1920s American films
Silent romantic drama films
Silent adventure films
Silent American drama films